The Serbian Super League of Handball for Women ( / Superliga Srbije u rukometu za žene) is the top women's handball league in Serbia. The league is composed of 12 teams. The league is operated by the Handball Federation of Serbia.

Teams 
The ten teams of the 2017/18 season.

Champions

Titles by Club

See also
 Serbian First League of Handball
 Handball Federation of Serbia

External links 
Handball Federation of Serbia

First League of Handball
Serbia
Women's sports leagues in Serbia
Professional sports leagues in Serbia
Handball competitions in Serbia